The 8th constituency of Bouches-du-Rhône is a French legislative constituency in Bouches-du-Rhône.

Deputies

Elections

2022

 
 
 
 
 
 
 
|-
| colspan="8" bgcolor="#E9E9E9"|
|-

2017

2012

|- style="background-color:#E9E9E9;text-align:center;"
! colspan="2" rowspan="2" style="text-align:left;" | Candidate
! rowspan="2" colspan="2" style="text-align:left;" | Party
! colspan="2" | 1st round
! colspan="2" | 2nd round
|- style="background-color:#E9E9E9;text-align:center;"
! width="75" | Votes
! width="30" | %
! width="75" | Votes
! width="30" | %
|-
| style="background-color:" |
| style="text-align:left;" | Olivier Ferrand
| style="text-align:left;" | Socialist Party
| PS
| 
| 31.55%
| 
| 40.48%
|-
| style="background-color:" |
| style="text-align:left;" | Nicolas Isnard
| style="text-align:left;" | Union for a Popular Movement
| UMP
| 
| 32.60%
| 
| 39.91%
|-
| style="background-color:" |
| style="text-align:left;" | Gérald Gerin
| style="text-align:left;" | Front National
| FN
| 
| 21.97%
| 
| 19.61%
|-
| style="background-color:" |
| style="text-align:left;" | Hélène Le Cacheux
| style="text-align:left;" | Left Front
| FG
| 
| 5.76%
| colspan="2" style="text-align:left;" |
|-
| style="background-color:" |
| style="text-align:left;" | Claude Cortesi
| style="text-align:left;" | 
| CEN
| 
| 2.67%
| colspan="2" style="text-align:left;" |
|-
| style="background-color:" |
| style="text-align:left;" | Jean-Yves Pied
| style="text-align:left;" | Far Right
| EXD
| 
| 1.13%
| colspan="2" style="text-align:left;" |
|-
| style="background-color:" |
| style="text-align:left;" | Rosa Alba Silvestri
| style="text-align:left;" | Radical Party of the Left
| PRG
| 
| 1.08%
| colspan="2" style="text-align:left;" |
|-
| style="background-color:" |
| style="text-align:left;" | Jean Frizzi
| style="text-align:left;" | Ecologist
| ECO
| 
| 0.92%
| colspan="2" style="text-align:left;" |
|-
| style="background-color:" |
| style="text-align:left;" | Jean-François Dorbeaux
| style="text-align:left;" | Miscellaneous Right
| DVD
| 
| 0.60%
| colspan="2" style="text-align:left;" |
|-
| style="background-color:" |
| style="text-align:left;" | Hakim Hallalen
| style="text-align:left;" | Centrist Alliance
| ALLI
| 
| 0.48%
| colspan="2" style="text-align:left;" |
|-
| style="background-color:" |
| style="text-align:left;" | José-Ramon Guardia
| style="text-align:left;" | Far Right
| EXD
| 
| 0.42%
| colspan="2" style="text-align:left;" |
|-
| style="background-color:" |
| style="text-align:left;" | Denis Vial
| style="text-align:left;" | Other
| AUT
| 
| 0.37%
| colspan="2" style="text-align:left;" |
|-
| style="background-color:" |
| style="text-align:left;" | Antonia Luciani Garcia
| style="text-align:left;" | Regionalist
| REG
| 
| 0.25%
| colspan="2" style="text-align:left;" |
|-
| style="background-color:" |
| style="text-align:left;" | Frédéric Kechra
| style="text-align:left;" | Far Left
| EXG
| 
| 0.23%
| colspan="2" style="text-align:left;" |
|-
| colspan="8" style="background-color:#E9E9E9;"|
|- style="font-weight:bold"
| colspan="4" style="text-align:left;" | Total
| 
| 100%
| 
| 100%
|-
| colspan="8" style="background-color:#E9E9E9;"|
|-
| colspan="4" style="text-align:left;" | Registered voters
| 
| style="background-color:#E9E9E9;"|
| 
| style="background-color:#E9E9E9;"|
|-
| colspan="4" style="text-align:left;" | Blank/Void ballots
| 
| 1.27%
| 
| 1.49%
|-
| colspan="4" style="text-align:left;" | Turnout
| 
| 58.75%
| 
| 60.15%
|-
| colspan="4" style="text-align:left;" | Abstentions
| 
| 41.25%
| 
| 39.85%
|-
| colspan="8" style="background-color:#E9E9E9;"|
|- style="font-weight:bold"
| colspan="6" style="text-align:left;" | Result
| colspan="2" style="background-color:" | PS GAIN
|}

2007

|- style="background-color:#E9E9E9;text-align:center;"
! colspan="2" rowspan="2" style="text-align:left;" | Candidate
! rowspan="2" colspan="2" style="text-align:left;" | Party
! colspan="2" | 1st round
! colspan="2" | 2nd round
|- style="background-color:#E9E9E9;text-align:center;"
! width="75" | Votes
! width="30" | %
! width="75" | Votes
! width="30" | %
|-
| style="background-color:" |
| style="text-align:left;" | Valérie Boyer
| style="text-align:left;" | Union for a Popular Movement
| UMP
| 
| 41.16%
| 
| 50.24%
|-
| style="background-color:" |
| style="text-align:left;" | Christophe Masse
| style="text-align:left;" | Socialist Party
| PS
| 
| 33.25%
| 
| 49.76%
|-
| style="background-color:" |
| style="text-align:left;" | Stéphane Durbec
| style="text-align:left;" | Front National
| FN
| 
| 8.05%
| colspan="2" style="text-align:left;" |
|-
| style="background-color:" |
| style="text-align:left;" | Sonia Arzano
| style="text-align:left;" | Democratic Movement
| MoDem
| 
| 5.16%
| colspan="2" style="text-align:left;" |
|-
| style="background-color:" |
| style="text-align:left;" | Michèle Ledesma
| style="text-align:left;" | Communist
| PCF
| 
| 3.54%
| colspan="2" style="text-align:left;" |
|-
| style="background-color:" |
| style="text-align:left;" | Jean-Marie Battini
| style="text-align:left;" | Far Left
| EXG
| 
| 2.23%
| colspan="2" style="text-align:left;" |
|-
| style="background-color:" |
| style="text-align:left;" | Bruno Cocaign
| style="text-align:left;" | The Greens
| VEC
| 
| 1.19%
| colspan="2" style="text-align:left;" |
|-
| style="background-color:" |
| style="text-align:left;" | Francis Belotti
| style="text-align:left;" | Movement for France
| MPF
| 
| 1.18%
| colspan="2" style="text-align:left;" |
|-
| style="background-color:" |
| style="text-align:left;" | Denise Picq
| style="text-align:left;" | Ecologist
| ECO
| 
| 1.03%
| colspan="2" style="text-align:left;" |
|-
| style="background-color:" |
| style="text-align:left;" | Olga Dhamelincourt Pibarot
| style="text-align:left;" | Miscellaneous Right
| DVD
| 
| 0.65%
| colspan="2" style="text-align:left;" |
|-
| style="background-color:" |
| style="text-align:left;" | Françoise Latour
| style="text-align:left;" | Ecologist
| ECO
| 
| 0.60%
| colspan="2" style="text-align:left;" |
|-
| style="background-color:" |
| style="text-align:left;" | Gérard Fleury
| style="text-align:left;" | Far Right
| EXD
| 
| 0.59%
| colspan="2" style="text-align:left;" |
|-
| style="background-color:" |
| style="text-align:left;" | Patrick Grenier
| style="text-align:left;" | Far Left
| EXG
| 
| 0.55%
| colspan="2" style="text-align:left;" |
|-
| style="background-color:" |
| style="text-align:left;" | Abel Djerari
| style="text-align:left;" | Independent
| DIV
| 
| 0.52%
| colspan="2" style="text-align:left;" |
|-
| style="background-color:" |
| style="text-align:left;" | Elisabeth Harmitt
| style="text-align:left;" | Independent
| DIV
| 
| 0.31%
| colspan="2" style="text-align:left;" |
|-
| style="background-color:" |
| style="text-align:left;" | Emmanuelle Barreyre
| style="text-align:left;" | Independent
| DIV
| 
| 0.00%
| colspan="2" style="text-align:left;" |
|-
| colspan="8" style="background-color:#E9E9E9;"|
|- style="font-weight:bold"
| colspan="4" style="text-align:left;" | Total
| 
| 100%
| 
| 100%
|-
| colspan="8" style="background-color:#E9E9E9;"|
|-
| colspan="4" style="text-align:left;" | Registered voters
| 
| style="background-color:#E9E9E9;"|
| 
| style="background-color:#E9E9E9;"|
|-
| colspan="4" style="text-align:left;" | Blank/Void ballots
| 
| 1.33%
| 
| 2.10%
|-
| colspan="4" style="text-align:left;" | Turnout
| 
| 56.72%
| 
| 57.26%
|-
| colspan="4" style="text-align:left;" | Abstentions
| 
| 43.28%
| 
| 42.74%
|-
| colspan="8" style="background-color:#E9E9E9;"|
|- style="font-weight:bold"
| colspan="6" style="text-align:left;" | Result
| colspan="2" style="background-color:" | UMP GAIN
|}

2002

 
 
 
 
 
|-
| colspan="8" bgcolor="#E9E9E9"|
|-

1997

 
 
 
 
 
|-
| colspan="8" bgcolor="#E9E9E9"|
|-

References

8